Margarete of Brunswick-Wolfenbüttel (1516 or 1517 – 28 October 1580, Stauffenburg) was a princess of Brunswick-Wolfenbüttel by birth and by marriage Duchess of Münsterberg, Oels and Bernstadt.

Life 
Margaret was the eldest child of the Duke Henry II of Brunswick-Wolfenbüttel (1489–1568) from his first marriage to Maria of Württemberg (1496–1541), daughter of Count Henry of Württemberg.

She married on 8 September 1561 in Oleśnica Duke John of Münsterberg and Oels (1509–1565).  With permission from the Estates, the castle and lordship of Frankenstein were reserved for Margarete as her Wittum.  After four years of childless marriage, John died and Margarete's stepson Charles Christopher sold off Frankenstein.  This caused a dispute between Margarete and Charles Christopher and his heirs, which was settled on 25 April 1577 by the intervention of Emperor Rudolf II in his capacity as King of Bohemia.

In the meantime, Margarete had returned to Brunswick.  She lived at the court of her brother Julius until in 1569 he gave her the lordship and castle of Stauffenburg, where she devoted herself to the care of the poor and the sick and the needy.

She died on 28 October 1580 in Stauffenburg.

Bibliography 
 Johann Samuel Ersch: Allgemeine Encyklopädie der Wissenschaften und Künste, part 2, vol. 21, Gleditsch, 1842, p. 350

References

External links 
 Women in power 1540-1570

Middle House of Brunswick
Duchesses of Brunswick-Wolfenbüttel
16th-century German people
1580 deaths
Year of birth uncertain
Place of birth missing
Daughters of monarchs